Ivan Marković (born 23 December 1991) is a Serbian football striker.

Professional career
In the winter's transfer window of 2017–18 season, Marković signed with Javor Ivanjica. In 2018–19 season, he was the 2018–19 Serbian First League top goalscorer, helping the club to gain promotion to the Serbian Superliga.

In September 2019, he signed a contract with the Moroccan club Mohammédia.

References

External links
 
 
 

1991 births
Footballers from Belgrade
Living people
Serbian footballers
Association football forwards
FK Čukarički players
FK Železničar Lajkovac players
FK Banat Zrenjanin players
Gyeongnam FC players
Gimhae FC players
FK Rad players
FK Rudar Pljevlja players
FK Novi Pazar players
FK Mladost Lučani players
FK Javor Ivanjica players
SCC Mohammédia players
FK Inđija players
FK Zlatibor Čajetina players
Serbian First League players
K3 League players
Serbian SuperLiga players
Montenegrin First League players
Serbian expatriate footballers
Expatriate footballers in South Korea
Serbian expatriate sportspeople in South Korea
Expatriate footballers in Montenegro
Serbian expatriate sportspeople in Montenegro
Expatriate footballers in Morocco
Serbian expatriate sportspeople in Morocco